Fred Kassi (born September 4, 1979) is a Cameroonian-born professional boxer based in New Orleans, Louisiana.

Professional career
After winning 15 of his first 16 professional fights, Kassi faced his first tough opponent. He was set to face Kendrick Releford in Hollywood Casino, Bay St. Louis, Mississippi, on April 24, 2010. He eventually lost the fight via unanimous points decision, after 10 rounds.

He fought three times American contender Chris Arreola, on July 18, 2015 at Don Haskins Center in El Paso, Texas, with the fight airing on PBC and CBS. The fight resulted in a controversial draw, with many, including ringside observers (among whom analyst Steve Farhood) believing Kassi had won the fight.

After the controversy with Arreola, he fought Dominic Breazeale at the Legacy Arena in Birmingham, Alabama. He lost via another controversial points decision. Breazeale was given an unanimous decision win by judges, with most observers regarding the fight as a draw or close-run win for Kassi.

He was set to fight Hughie Fury for the vacant WBO Inter-Continental heavyweight title at the Copper Box Arena on April 30, 2016. Kassi lost the fight via technical decision. The bout went to the scorecards after seven rounds after Fury was left with a gash over his left eye after an accidental clash of heads. Kassi pressured Fury throughout the fight, landing power shots on his head, with Fury struggling to contain him until the fight was suspended.

He was set to face Jarrell Miller on August 29, 2016, for the WBO-NABO heavyweight title. The fight took place in Rhinos Stadium, Rochester, and Kassi lost it as he retired in the third round, citing hand injury.

Professional boxing record

References

1979 births
Living people
Heavyweight boxers
Cameroonian male boxers
American male boxers